Preciosas (lit: Beautiful) also known as Runaways, is a Chilean television series created by Catalina Calcagni, that aired on Canal 13 from August 1, 2016, to January 31, 2017, starring Loreto Aravena, Pablo Macaya, and Paulo Brunetti. The series follows a group of women convicts from a high security prison in Santiago, and the relationship between its members, when they escape from prison. With freedom they are confronted with never before faced adventures and challenges, including national persecution by police, while the media keep all Chile informed of their movements, then nicknaming the group as Preciosas.

Comprising a total of 94 episodes, the series feature a primary storyline set on Lorena Martínez, an innocent woman accused of murder with a dramatic court case, that had hidden evidence and instances of falsification of relevant information, however she is the secret lover of the case prosecutor who blames her. Preciosas became an Internet phenomenon in Chile, keeping everyday in the first position as a Trending topic in its country of origin and worldwide in the social network Twitter, surpassing its television competition and obtaining high numbers of followers in social networks like Facebook.

Cast

Main characters 
 Loreto Aravena as Lorena Martínez García / Angelina Jolie Pérez Soto (alias The hammer).
 Pablo Macaya as Alex Castillo Hertz.
 Paulo Brunetti as Ismael Domínguez.

Supporting characters 
Related to Preciosas band
 Paz Bascuñán as Frida Segovia / Estrella Anís Lagos Fuentes(alias La jugo).
 Lorena Bosch as Montserrat Flores / Cecilia Diana Casán (alias La Come Momias).
 Susana Hidalgo as Lisette Parra / Yulissa Constantina Del Pino Del Bosque (alias Crespita Parra).
 Malucha Pinto as Marta Brosic (alias La Superiora).
 Tamara Acosta as Elsa Morales Carmona (alias La Loca).
 Karla Melo as Paola Romina Farfán Vilches (alias Palo Santo).
 Cristián Arriagada as Darío Mardones Brosic.
 Nicolás Poblete as Eric Ibarra (alias Príncipe Eric , El Barsa).
 Simoney Romero as María Camila Pérez (alias Perla Negra).
 Oliver Borner as Matías Mardones Brosic.

Related to Márquez family
 Cristián Campos as Arturo Márquez.
 Alessandra Guerzoni as Victoria Walker.
 Elvira Cristi as Florencia Márquez.
 Lucy Cominetti as Begoña Salinas.
 Eusebio Arenas as Vicente Márquez (alias Vicho).
 Geraldine Neary as Gabriela Martínez García (alias Yuyo).
 Teresa Münchmeyer as María Elena Hernández (alias Nena).

Related to police department
 José Secall as Patricio Teodoro Rojas (Chief).
 Josefina Montané as Amanda Rojas (Detective).
 Eyal Meyer as Nicolás Infante (Detective).

Guest appearances 
 Francisco Pérez-Bannen as Juan Pablo Correa (ep. 1, 94).
 Miguel Acuña as TV reporter (ep. 1, 94).
 Verónica González as Prison officer (ep. 1-2, 94).
 Maureen Junott as Amiga de Montserrat (ep. 4-5).
 Catalina González as Sofía Jimenez Ramos (ep. 8-9, 45, 90).
 Marcela Medel as María Ester Suárez (ep. 28-30).
 Coca Rudolphy as Isidora (ep. 28-30).
 Carmen Barros as Adelaida (ep. 28-30).
 Jaime Omeñaca as Claudio Vilches (ep. 30-40, 90).
 Javiera Díaz de Valdés as Psychiatrist (ep. 78-80).

Soundtrack

Releases

Other songs

Characters

Locations 
 "Fuego" by Bomba Estéreo.
 "Buenas noches, desolación" by Julieta Venegas.
 "Irresponsables" by Babasónicos.
 "No me importa nada" by Luz Casal.
 "Un año más" by La Sonora de Tommy Rey.
 "No pasa na" by La Teruka.

Reception

Television ratings

International broadcast 
 Ecuador: Telerama (2017).
 Middle East and North Africa: Rewayat Fox (2017-2018).

References

External links 
  

2016 Chilean television series debuts
2017 Chilean television series endings
2016 telenovelas
Chilean telenovelas
Canal 13 (Chilean TV channel) telenovelas
Spanish-language telenovelas
Television shows set in Santiago